The African American Museum and Library at Oakland (AAMLO) is a museum and non-circulating library dedicated to preserving African American history, experiences and culture on 14th Street in Downtown Oakland. It contains an extensive archival collection of such artifacts as diaries, correspondence, photos, and periodicals.

History
The AAMLO is located at the Charles S. Greene building which previously was the Carnegie library. The building served as the Oakland Main Library from 1902 to 1951.

The AAMLO began as a private collection in 1946, and on July 2,1965 became the East Bay Negro Historical Society (EBNHS). It later changed its name to the Northern California Center for Afro-American History & Life, before being incorporated into the city of Oakland in 1994 under its current name, the African American Museum and Library at Oakland.

Among the more than 160 collections in the library are archives relating to Martin Luther King Jr., Malcolm X, the Black Panthers, Africa, and genealogy. Materials include photographs, manuscripts, letters, diaries, newspapers, recorded oral histories, videos, and microfilms. AAMLO's two galleries host changing exhibitions of art, history, and culture, including collaborative exhibitions. 

Eugene & Ruth Lasartemay and Jesse & Dr. Marcella began collecting artifacts and documents creating the private collection in 1946. Initially housed in a small shop front on Grove Street (now Martin Luther King, Jr. Way), the collection grew quickly and in 1982, was moved into the Oakland Public Library's Golden Gate Branch. It officially became AAMLO, a public/private partnership, in 1994. AAMLO moved into its current location in 2002.

See also

List of museums focused on African Americans

References

External links
  
 The AAMLO Website
 Friends of the Oakland Library page on the AAMLO
 Oakland Heritage page on the AAMLO
A number of photographs from the AAMLO collection

Museums in Oakland, California
Ethnic libraries
Education in Oakland, California
African-American museums in California
African-American history in Oakland, California
Libraries in Alameda County, California
Library buildings completed in 1900
Libraries on the National Register of Historic Places in California
National Register of Historic Places in Oakland, California
Bliss and Faville buildings
Beaux-Arts architecture in California